Ashok Kumar is a 1941 Indian Tamil-language historical drama film directed by Raja Chandrasekhar. Based on a legend involving the Mauryan emperor Ashoka The Great, his son Kunala and Ashoka's second wife Thishyarakshai, it stars M. K. Thyagaraja Bhagavathar, Chittoor V. Nagayya and P. Kannamba. The film was released on 17 September 1941.

Plot 
The Mauryan emperor Ashokar's son Kunalan is courted by Ashokar's second wife Tishyarakshai. When he rejects her advances, he is falsely accused by the queen of trying to seduce her, and is thrown into prison and blinded. The story, however, comes to a happy end with his eyesight being restored by Gautama Buddha and the king acquits him of all the charges.

Cast 

Male cast
 M. K. Thyagaraja Bhagavathar as Kunalan
 Chittoor V. Nagayya as Samrat Ashokar
 Rangasami Iyengar as Radhaguptar
 N. S. Krishnan as Doctor Theraiyan
 K. Mahadeva Iyer as Upaguptar
 M. G. Ramchandar as Mahendran
 K. V. Venkatrama Iyer as Kanjuki
 Murali as Kokkaiyan
 R. Ranjan  as Gautama Buddha (uncredited)

Female cast
 P. Kannamba as Tishyarakshai
 T. V. Kumudhini as Kanchanamala
 T. A. Mathuram as Pramila

Production 
Ashok Kumar is based on a legend involving the Mauryan emperor Ashoka, his son Kunalan and Ashoka's younger queen Thishyarakshai. It was the first Tamil film based on the legend, which was previously filmed in Hindi as Veer Kunal (1925). Telugu actress P. Kannamba played the role of Thishyarakshai. This was her second Tamil film and since she did not know the language, she was provided with a script in which Tamil words had been transliterated into Telugu. Ashok Kumar marked the debut of Ranjan (credited as R. Ramani), who portrayed Gautama Buddha. The song and dance sequence, "Unnai Kandu Mayangaatha" was shot in a single night at Newtone Studio.

Soundtrack 
The songs were composed by Alathur V. Subramanyam and the lyrics were written by Papanasam Sivan. Playback singers are Rama Rao and Mani of the Renuka Orchestra.

Music Credits 

Sharma Brothers Orchestra
 R. N. Thambi – Veena
 V. Govindasami – Fiddle
 N. L. Ramalingam – Harmonium
 R. V. Parikshithu – Mridangam

Release and reception 
Ashok Kumar was released on 17 September 1941. Kay Yess Enn of The Indian Express praised the film for Kannamba's performance.

In other media 
Portions of "Bhoomiyil Maanida" were used in "Theepidikka", a song in Arinthum Ariyamalum (2005).

References

Bibliography

External links 
 

1940s Tamil-language films
1941 films
Films set in ancient India
Indian black-and-white films
Indian historical drama films
Memorials to Ashoka
Works about the Maurya Empire
Films scored by Alathur V. Subramanyam
Cultural depictions of Ashoka
Cultural depictions of Gautama Buddha